The Power Within is a 1979 American TV movie.

The Los Angeles Times called it "amusingly absurd."

Plot
A pilot develops super powers after being struck by lightning.

Cast
Art Hindle as Chris Darrow
Edward Binns as Gen. Tom Darrow
Joseph Rassulo as Bill Camelli
Eric Braeden as Stephens
David Hedison as Danton
Susan Howard as Dr. Joanne Miller
Dick Sargent as Capt. Ed Holman

References

External links

The Power Within at BFI

1979 television films
1979 films
ABC network original films
1970s English-language films
Television pilots not picked up as a series
Films directed by John Llewellyn Moxey